Antona repleta is a moth of the subfamily Arctiinae first described by Francis Walker in 1854. It is found in the Amazon basin.

References

Lithosiini
Moths described in 1854
Moths of South America